Rutland and Stamford was a county constituency comprising the area centred on the town of Stamford in Lincolnshire, and the county of Rutland.  It returned one Member of Parliament (MP) to the House of Commons of the Parliament of the United Kingdom, using the first-past-the-post voting system.

The constituency was created for the 1918 general election, and abolished for the 1983 general election.  It was succeeded by the Rutland and Melton and Stamford and Spalding constituencies.

Boundaries 
1918–1950: The administrative county of Rutland, the Municipal Borough of Stamford, the Urban District of Bourne, the Rural Districts of Bourne and Uffington, and part of the Rural District of Grantham.

1950–1983: The administrative county of Rutland, the Municipal Borough of Stamford, the Urban District of Bourne, the Rural District of South Kesteven, and parts of the Rural Districts of East Kesteven and West Kesteven.

Members of Parliament 

In 1983 Rutland became part of the Rutland and Melton constituency along with Melton borough and part of Harborough District in Leicestershire.

Elections

Elections in the 1910s

Elections in the 1920s

Elections in the 1930s 

General Election 1939–40

Another General Election was required to take place before the end of 1940. The political parties had been making preparations for an election to take place and by the Autumn of 1939, the following candidates had been selected; 
Conservative: James Heathcote-Drummond-Willoughby
Labour: Arnold William Gray

Elections in the 1940s

Elections in the 1950s

Elections in the 1960s

Elections in the 1970s

See also
 Stamford (UK Parliament list of constituencies)

References 

Parliamentary constituencies in Rutland (historic)
Parliamentary constituencies in Lincolnshire (historic)
Constituencies of the Parliament of the United Kingdom established in 1918
Constituencies of the Parliament of the United Kingdom disestablished in 1983
Oakham
Uppingham
Ketton